The R517 road is a regional road in Ireland which links the R512 regional road in County Limerick with Mitchelstown in County Cork. The road passes through the village of Kilfinane.

See also 

 Roads in Ireland
 National primary road
 National secondary road

References 

Regional roads in the Republic of Ireland

Roads in County Limerick
Roads in County Cork